Concrete Jungle Vol. 1 is the fifth studio album by American rap group South Central Cartel. It was released on August 3, 1999 through Mouth Piece Entertainment. Recording sessions took place at Pee-Wee's House Studio with Austin "Prodeje" Patterson, along with producers Robert "Fonksta" Bacon, Tomie Mundy and Troy "Talkbox" Mason, and executive producer Cary "Havoc" Calvin. The album features guest performances from C-Bo, Daz Dillinger, Spice 1 and the Floc Gang. S.C.C.'s member L.V. appeared only on one track, "All Day Long", as featured artist. The album in dedicated to Paul "Payback Da' Emeny" Brown.

Track listing 
 Concrete Jungle
 No Man Shall I Fear
 Break Bread
 Costa Nostra
 They Don't Want It
 All Day Long (featuring L.V.)
 Thug Disease (featuring Spice 1 and C-Bo)
 Huh What (featuring Daz Dillinger)
 Ride Till I Die
 Made 'N' America
 What You Waitin 4 (featuring Gangsta Wayne, Evil Skeem and Young Dee)
 Feelin How I'm Feel 'N'
 Hit Me on My Pager

References

External links

1999 albums
South Central Cartel albums
Albums produced by Prodeje